is a Japanese sprinter. He competed in the men's 4 × 400 metres relay at the 1964 Summer Olympics.

References

External links

1942 births
Living people
Place of birth missing (living people)
Japanese male sprinters
Olympic male sprinters
Olympic athletes of Japan
Athletes (track and field) at the 1964 Summer Olympics
Japan Championships in Athletics winners
20th-century Japanese people